Shibpur may refer to:

 Shibpur area of Howrah city in West Bengal, India
 Shibpur (Vidhan Sabha constituency), a West Bengal Legislative Assembly constituency
 Sibpur, Paschim Bardhaman, a village in West Bengal, India
 Shibpur (Andaman), a village in Diglipur Tehsil of Andaman & Nicobar islands, India
 Shibpur Upazila of Narsingdi District, Bangladesh

See also
 Shivpur (disambiguation)